Szemborowo  is a village in the administrative district of Gmina Strzałkowo, within Słupca County, Greater Poland Voivodeship, in west-central Poland.

The village has a population of 354.

References

Szemborowo